Cuproxena nudana is a species of moth of the family Tortricidae. It is found in Napo Province, Ecuador.

The ground colour of the forewings is cream ochreous with pale ferruginous strigulation (fine streaks). The hindwings are cream, tinged with pale ochreous and mixed with orange at the apex.

Etymology
The species name refers to the sacculus, which is bare of any process and is derived from Latin nudus (meaning naked, bare).

References

Moths described in 2007
Cuproxena
Moths of South America
Taxa named by Józef Razowski